Lucius Volusius Saturninus was the name of several Ancient Romans:

 Lucius Volusius Saturninus (suffect consul 12 BC) (c. 60 BC – AD 20), Roman senator, suffect consul in 12 BC, governor of Africa c. 8-4 BC, governor of Syria 4 BC – AD 5.
 Lucius Volusius Saturninus (suffect consul 3) (38/7 BC – AD 56), Roman senator, suffect consul in AD 3, proconsul of Anatolia in AD 9-10, legatus pro praetore of Illyricum and Dalmatia.
 Lucius Volusius Saturninus (pontiff) (d. c. AD 55), member of the College of Pontiffs.
 Lucius Volusius Saturninus (consul 87) (fl. AD 87), Roman senator, consul in AD 87.
 Lucius Volusius Saturninus (Augur), (fl. first half 2nd century AD), augur and suffect consul.